Henri Albert François Joseph Raphaël Alibert (17 February 1887 – 5 June 1963) was a French politician known for his association with the collaborationist regime of Vichy France during World War II. A royalist, traditionalist, and member of Action Française, Alibert was one of the chief ideologues of the constitutional law that transformed the French Third Republic into an authoritarian state under the rule of Marshal Philippe Pétain.

Politics
Raphael Alibert was an ardent Roman Catholic convert  and someone with strong royalist ideas. One of the most intense followers of Charles Maurras, Alibert was elected to the Chamber of Deputies for the Action Française party. In October 1939 he and Henry Lémery had visited Maréchal Petain to discuss in private the make-up of a possible ministry with him.

Enters government
In the French government's new Cabinet formed on 16 June 1940 he was appointed Under-Secretary of State to the Prime Minister, now Pétain. He was one of the opposition within the Cabinet to removing the government to North Africa after the Armistice with Germany, and it is said that he was instrumental in preventing the departure by President Albert Lebrun and Camille Chautemps on 20 June 1940, although General Weygand, also opposed to a move, had already urged Lebrun to remain until the evening. In the event only 30 deputies and just one senator departed.

Alibert was responsible for Exposé des motifs, his document forming the basis for the Révolution Nationale, a proposition which the Chamber and Senate adopted on the 9 July 1940. Contrary to post-war opinions, Otto Abetz, the German Ambassador in Paris, saw clearly that "nothing could have been further from fascism, whether of the Italian or German variety, than the Revolution Nationale". Abetz felt instead that the government at Vichy believed in "reactionary, hierarchical principals" and that its "nationalism was dangerous to the European concept of the New Order". The following day Pétain signed three 'Constitutional Acts' drafted by Alibert. the first announced that he himself was taking over the functions of the 'French State', in other words that he was becoming 'Head of State'. The second gave the Head of State complete and overall power, both executive and legislative. The third adjourned the Chamber of Deputies and the Senate sine die; they could only be reconvened by Order of the Head of State. Laval remarked that Pétain had been granted more powers than Louis XIV. Pétain, however, maintained that he never wished to assume the mantle of a Caesar, and that he only wanted to serve until a Peace Treaty with Germany had been signed and he could retire.

Alibert was made Keeper of the Seals (Garde des sceaux) from 12 July 1940 to 27 January 1941, and was appointed Minister of Justice in the new Cabinet formed on 13 July 1940, during the time the government was removed to Vichy.

On 22 July he instituted a review of all naturalisations since 1927. This resulted in 15,000 people, including 600 Jews, having their French citizenships revoked and being made stateless.

In keeping with the ideals of Action Francaise, he promulgated the law dissolving secret societies (Freemasonry amongst others) on 13 August 1940, aided in this project by other devout Catholics, notably Bernard Fay, administrator of the Bibliothèque Nationale, and Robert Vallery-Radot. Their task was to root out about 15,000 Masonic dignitaries from public life, as part of an effort by militant right-wing Christians to displace, while taking revenge on, their 'secularising' enemies.

The new government took a serious anti-semitic position, and he also promulgated the first Law on the status of Jews of October 1940 which excluded Jews from certain Civil Service posts and presaged action against those in the so-called liberal professions.

The German Ambassador to France, Otto Abetz, wrote to von Ribbentrop on 8 October 1940 saying that "some (French) ministers, such as Alibert, Baudouin and Bouthillier, are hoping for an eventual restoration of the Bourbons". By mid-November that year Alibert, Yvres Bouthillier, Paul Baudouin, Marcel Peyrouton (Minister of the Interior), Jean Darlan and General Huntziger were putting pressure upon Pétain to have Pierre Laval dismissed from office, in which they were successful on 13 December. A furious Abetz visited Pétain calling for Laval's reinstatement and the dismissal of the plotters against him, including Alibert, to no avail. However, on 9 February 1941 Alibert and Pierre-Etienne Flandin were both dismissed from the government, "probably as a sop to the Germans".

After war
At the end of the war, Alibert fled abroad into hiding, and was condemned to death in absentia on 7 March 1947. Living in exile in Belgium, he was finally given amnesty in 1959, four years before his death from natural causes.

In culture
 Hôtel du Parc (1992) ; co-scénarists : Pierre Beuchot and Jérôme Prieur ; avec André Wilms et Marylène Dagouat. Raphaël Alibert was played by Jean Périmony

See also 
 Louis Darquier de Pellepoix
 Xavier Vallat

References

1887 births
1963 deaths
People from Lot (department)
People affiliated with Action Française
Anti-Masonry
French exiles
French Ministers of Justice
People sentenced to death in absentia
French politicians convicted of crimes